Vyncint Smith (born June 9, 1996) is an American football wide receiver for the Indianapolis Colts of the National Football League (NFL). Smith was born in Germany while his US army parents were stationed there, but he grew up in South Carolina where he played college football at Limestone University. He signed with the Houston Texans as an undrafted free agent in 2018.

Professional career

Houston Texans
Smith made his NFL debut in Week 1 against the New England Patriots. The next week, in the 27–22 loss to the New York Giants, he caught his first career pass, a 28-yard reception.

On August 31, 2019, Smith was waived by the Texans and was signed to the practice squad the next day.

New York Jets
On September 23, 2019, Smith was signed by the New York Jets off the Texans practice squad.
In week 5 against the Philadelphia Eagles, Smith rushed 1 time for a 19-yard touchdown in the 31-6 loss. This was Smith's first career rushing touchdown.

On September 7, 2020, Smith was placed on injured reserve. He was activated on October 17.

On March 13, 2021, Smith re-signed with the Jets. He was waived on August 31, 2021 and re-signed to the practice squad the next day.

Tampa Bay Buccaneers
On January 31, 2022, Smith signed a reserve/future contract with the Tampa Bay Buccaneers. He was released on August 21, 2022.

Denver Broncos
On September 5, 2022, Smith was signed to the Denver Broncos practice squad. He was released on October 11.

Indianapolis Colts
On October 17, 2022, Smith was signed to the Indianapolis Colts practice squad. He signed a reserve/future contract on January 9, 2023.

References

External links
Houston Texans bio
Limestone bio

1996 births
Living people
American football wide receivers
Denver Broncos players
Houston Texans players
Limestone Saints athletes
New York Jets players
Players of American football from Columbia, South Carolina
Tampa Bay Buccaneers players
Indianapolis Colts players